The Emerald Coast Classic at Sandestin is a golf tournament on the Korn Ferry Tour. It was first played in April 2021 at Raven Golf Club at Sandestin Golf and Beach Resort near Miramar Beach, Florida.

Winners

Bolded golfers graduated to the PGA Tour via the Korn Ferry Tour regular-season money list.

References

External links
Coverage on the Korn Ferry Tour's official site

Former Korn Ferry Tour events
Golf in Florida
2021 establishments in Florida
2021 disestablishments in Florida